ALF Tales is a 30-minute Saturday morning animated series that aired on NBC from September 10, 1988, to December 9, 1989. The show is a spin-off of ALF: The Animated Series which featured characters from that series playing various characters from fairy tales. The fairy tale parody was usually altered for comedic effect in a manner akin to Jay Ward's "Fractured Fairy Tales".

The episodes were performed in the style of a resident theater company or ensemble cast where Gordon and Rhonda would take the leading male and female roles, and the other characters were cast according to their characteristics.

Many stories spoof a film genre, such as the "Cinderella" episode which is presented like an Elvis Presley film. Some episodes featured a "fourth wall" effect where Gordon is backstage preparing for the episode, and Rob Cowan would appear drawn as a TV executive (who introduced himself as "Roger Cowan, network executive") who tries to brief Gordon on how to improve this episode. For instance Cowan once told Gordon who was readying for a medieval themed episode that "less than 2% of our audience lives in the Dark Ages".

Cast
Paul Fusco – ALF (Gordon Shumway)/Rick Fusterman
Tabitha St. Germain (as Paulina Gillis) – Augie/Rhonda
Peggy Mahon – Flo
Thick Wilson – Larson Petty/Bob
Dan Hennessey – Sloop
Rob Cowan – Skip
Ellen-Ray Hennessy – Stella the Waitress
Noam Zylberman – Curtis (1988)
Michael Fantini – Curtis (1989)

Episodes

Season 1 (1988–89)

Season 2 (1989)

Home media
The first seven episodes were released on DVD on May 30, 2006, in Region 1 from Lionsgate Home Entertainment in a single-disc release entitled ALF and The Beanstalk and Other Classic Fairy Tales.

See also
List of animated spinoffs from prime time shows

References

External links
 

ALF (TV series)
1980s American animated television series
1980s American comic science fiction television series
1988 American television series debuts
1989 American television series endings
American animated television spin-offs
American children's animated comic science fiction television series
Animated television series about extraterrestrial life
English-language television shows
NBC original programming
Television series by DIC Entertainment
Television series by Lorimar Television
Television series by Saban Entertainment
Television series created by Paul Fusco
Television series created by Tom Patchett
Television shows based on fairy tales
Television series by Lorimar-Telepictures